Every Day is a 2010 comedy-drama film written and directed by Richard Levine and starring Liev Schreiber, Helen Hunt,  Carla Gugino, Eddie Izzard, Ezra Miller, and Brian Dennehy.

Synopsis 
Ned (Schrieber) is a man under pressure. As a scriptwriter, his boss (Izzard) is pushing him to add extra shocks into his latest project. As a husband, he is coping with his stressed out wife (Hunt) and her sick, alcoholic father (Dennehy). As a father, he is worried about his gay son (Miller) coming out, and watching his youngest (Fortgang) spiral into perfectionism-induced anxiety. When he is assigned a provocative free spirit (Gugino) as a writing partner, he is forced to examine whether the life he has is really the life he wants.

Cast
 Liev Schreiber as Ned Freed
 Helen Hunt as Jeannie Freed
 Carla Gugino as Robin
 Ezra Miller as Jonah Freed
 Skyler Fortgang as Ethan Freed
 David Harbour as Brian
 Eddie Izzard as Garrett
 Brian Dennehy as Ernie Freed

Reception
 
Every Day was an official selection for the 2010 Tribeca Film Festival, where it was met with lukewarm reviews. Adam Keleman of Slant Magazine called the film "a quaint but inane portrait of a modern-day Big Apple family". Stephen Holden of the New York Times said the film is very well written and acted.

Box office 
Every Day was released in theaters on January 11, 2011. At its widest release, the film was only shown in four theaters, and grossed $46,209, far below its $3 million production budget.

Critical response 
Every Day received mixed reviews from critics. Rotten Tomatoes gives the film a score of 34% based on reviews from 32 critics. At Metacritic the film received a score of 48 based on reviews from 12 critics.

Home media 
Every Day was released on DVD on March 8, 2011.

References

External links

 
 
 
 

2010 films
2010 comedy-drama films
American comedy-drama films
American LGBT-related films
Films scored by Jeanine Tesori
Films set in New York City
Films shot in New York City
American independent films
2010 directorial debut films
2010 independent films
LGBT-related comedy-drama films
2010 LGBT-related films
2010s English-language films
2010s American films